Reece Howden (born 12 July 1998) is a Canadian freestyle skier who competes internationally in the ski cross discipline.

Career

Junior
At the 2016 Winter Youth Olympics in Lillehammer, Norway, Howden won the gold medal in the ski cross event and was Canada's flagbearer during the closing ceremony.

Senior
Howden won his first World Cup race in 2020, his rookie season. Howden would go on to win the crystal globe, awarded to the overall points leader per discipline for the 2020–21 FIS Freestyle Ski World Cup season. During the season Howden won four races and had two other podium finishes.

Howden had a fifth-place finish at the 2021 World Championships.

On January 24, 2022, Howden was named to Canada's 2022 Olympic team.

References

External links 

1998 births
Living people
Canadian male freestyle skiers
People from Chilliwack
Sportspeople from British Columbia
Freestyle skiers at the 2016 Winter Youth Olympics
Freestyle skiers at the 2022 Winter Olympics
Olympic freestyle skiers of Canada
Youth Olympic gold medalists for Canada